Antena 21 is a Spanish-language broadcast television station in Santo Domingo, Dominican Republic on UHF channel 21. It's owned by Albavision. It was founded in 1968 as Noticias 24 Horas. The station currently aires general entertainment programming.

History
Noticias 24 Horas began broadcasting on UHF channel 21 in 1968 as a news-only television station. In 1972, an earthquake destroyed the station's facilities; it returned in 1975. In 1997, the station changed its name to Antena 21. The station has changed from a news-intensive format into a general entertainment format.

Television stations in the Dominican Republic